Tommaso Brignoli (born 23 December 1999), is an Italian professional footballer who plays as a midfielder for  club Pro Patria.

References

External links

1999 births
Living people
People from Desio
Footballers from Lombardy
Italian footballers
Association football midfielders
Serie C players
Rende Calcio 1968 players
Inter Milan players
A.C. Monza players
Aurora Pro Patria 1919 players
Sportspeople from the Province of Monza e Brianza